Piero Ceccarini (born 20 October 1953) is an Italian former football referee. He is mostly known for a controversial decision he made during a match in Turin between Juventus and Inter on 26 April 1998.

Ceccarini is known to have worked as a FIFA referee during the period from 1993 to 1998. He officiated in qualifiers for Euro 1996, Euro 2000, and the 1998 World Cup.

Career
Ceccarini was born in Livorno.

During the 1997–98 Serie A season, Ceccarini was at the centre of a controversial decision in Juventus's Derby d'Italia match in Turin against Inter on 26 April 1998: a collision that occurred between Inter striker Ronaldo and Juventus defender Mark Iuliano in the Juventus penalty area, which saw both players go to ground, led the Inter players to claim what they felt to be a clear penalty for a tackle of obstruction, but Ceccarini let the play continue as the players continued to protest; to add to the controversy, Juventus were awarded a contested penalty only thirty seconds later. Although Juventus did not convert the penalty successfully, they still ended up winning the match 1–0, and went on to win the league title mathematically two days later, following a 3–2 home win against Bologna, with Inter finishing in second place. Following the match Ceccarini came out publicly and stated that he had made a mistake, and that he should have called the foul and assigned a penalty to Inter for the challenge, although that, at the time, he did not witness the entire play that led to the incident, only the collision between the two players, which drew further criticism from the press. Up to this day, the incident has therefore acquired a degree of infamy, and is still widely debated in the Italian media, and often cited in newspapers. When asked about the episode in a 2009 interview, however, Ceccarini changed his view and said that in hindsight he would have not awarded a penalty, but instead an indirect free kick to Inter inside the penalty area for obstruction. In an even more recent interview with the newspaper Il Tirreno in 2016, however, Ceccarini later further clarified, "From the images it is clear that Ronaldo runs into Iuliano, not vice versa: as a matter of fact, the Juventus player falls backwards, resulting from the impact of Ronaldo running into him. I was on the pitch, a few meters away. The intention of the defender was to stop the attacker's progression, but the attacker moved the ball and the defender did not follow it. Iuliano was stationary at the moment of contact, there are no doubts about this. I told Pagliuca [Inter's goalkeeper] that in basketball this would be an offensive foul. Perhaps I ought to have blown a foul in favour of Juventus".

In 1996 he refereed one match in the 1996 UEFA European Football Championship in England.

References

External links
 Profile at worldfootball.net

1953 births
Living people
Italian football referees
UEFA Euro 1996 referees